The Hero's Journey is a 1987 biography of mythologist Joseph Campbell (1904–1987), directed by Janelle Balnicke and David Kennard. In the years just before his death, Campbell was filmed in conversation with his friends and colleagues, discussing his own life and career in terms of the myths that he studied throughout his life.

The conversations in the film led to the book, The Hero's Journey: Joseph Campbell on His Life and Work (1990).

See also
 The Hero's Journey (book)

References

 The Hero's Journey at Yahoo! Movies

External links
 
 The Hero's Journey, Excerpts
 

Comparative mythology
Documentary films about writers
1987 films
Joseph Campbell
1980s English-language films